Pseudo-Justin is the designation used by scholars for the anonymous author of any work falsely attributed to Justin Martyr, such as the following:

Exhortation to the Greeks
Oratio ad Graecos
De resurrectione, possibly written by Athenagoras of Athens or Hippolytus of Rome
Expositio rectae fidei, possibly written by Theodoret of Cyrrhus
De monarchia, which contains a poem by Pseudo-Orpheus

Notes